Sun Ripeng (born 25 January 1974 in Zhuanghe, Liaoning province) is a Chinese former track and field athlete who specialised in the 3000 metres steeplechase. He was the gold medallist at the 1994 Asian Games. His personal best of 8:10.46 minutes is the Chinese record for the steeplechase.

He was a silver medallist at the 1993 East Asian Games and a 5000 metres bronze medallist at the Asian Games. He was a two-time winner of the National Games of China steeplechase, and also a two-time 5000 m national champion.

Career
Born in Zhuanghe in China's Liaoning Province, Sun established himself in the junior category on home turf in Beijing with a steeplechase gold medal at the 1990 Asian Junior Athletics Championships, becoming the tournament's inaugural winner for that event. He returned to defend his title two years later, but ended with bronze medals in both the steeplechase and 5000 metres.

Sun's first senior honours came the following year, when he won the steeplechase title at the 7th National Games of China in a time of 8:24.97 minutes – knocking almost twenty seconds off the games record. The inaugural East Asian Games held in Shanghai that year brought him his first international medal, taking silver behind Japan's Akira Nakamura.

The peak of Sun's career was the 1994 track and field season. He began with a national title win in the 5000 m at the Chinese Athletics Championships. He was entered for both this event and his steeplechase speciality at the 1994 Asian Games. He won the bronze medal in the 5000 m, beaten by Japan's Toshinari Takaoka and Ahmed Ibrahim Warsama of Qatar by a margin of less than one second. He was the clear gold medallist in the steeplechase, setting an Asian Games record of 8:31.73 minutes – a full two seconds clear of Saudi athlete Saad Shadad Al-Asmari. This record stood until the 2002, when it was bettered by Qatar's Kenyan-born runner Khamis Seif Abdullah. It was the last major medal of Sun's international career.

Still in the under-21 category, he won the steeplechase at the Chinese City Games in 1995. He followed this with a second career victory over 5000 m at the national championships in 1996. Sun defended his steeplechase title at the 1997 National Games of China with a lifetime best performance of 8:10.46 minutes – this was (and remains) the Chinese record for the event. It is the second best time achieved in the event by an Asian-born athlete, with only Saad Al-Asmari having run faster (many East African-born athletes have run faster for Asian nations, including world record holder Saif Saaeed Shaheen). Sun's last high level appearance was at the 2001 National Games of China, where he failed to make the steeplechase final, effectively bringing a close to the 31-year-old's career.

National titles
National Games of China
3000 metres steeplechase: 1993, 1997
Chinese Athletics Championships
5000 metres: 1994, 1996
Chinese City Games
3000 metres steeplechase: 1995

International competitions

References

External links

Living people
1974 births
Athletes from Dalian
Chinese male steeplechase runners
Chinese male long-distance runners
Athletes (track and field) at the 1994 Asian Games
Asian Games medalists in athletics (track and field)
Asian Games gold medalists for China
Asian Games bronze medalists for China
Medalists at the 1994 Asian Games
Runners from Liaoning